Karla Victoria Aponte Colón (born 1998) is a Puerto Rican footballer, model and beauty pageant titleholder. She was crowned Miss Earth Puerto Rico 2017 on August 9, 2017 at La Concha Renaissance Hotel in Condado, San Juan, Puerto Rico, she represented Puerto Rico at the Miss Earth 2017 pageant.

Pageantary

Miss Universe Puerto Rico 2017
Aponte recently competed in Miss Universe Puerto Rico 2017 competition where she placed in the Top 10.

Miss Earth Puerto Rico 2017
In 2017, Aponte joined and won the Miss Earth Puerto Rico 2017 pageant wherein she succeeded Franceska Toro.

Miss Earth 2017
Aponte represented Puerto Rico in the Miss Earth 2017 pageant in the Philippines, she did not place among the finalists.

Football career

Aponte has represented Puerto Rico at the 2015 CONCACAF Women's U-20 Championship qualification, scoring once.

References

External links
 Karla Victoria Aponte on Instagram

1998 births
Living people
People from Guaynabo, Puerto Rico
Women's association football forwards
Puerto Rican women's footballers
Puerto Rican beauty pageant winners
Miss Earth 2017 contestants
Puerto Rican female models